Simone Papa the Younger (about 1506–1567) was a Neapolitan fresco painter from Italy. Considered one of the best mannerists of this time, he was a scholar of Giovanni Antonio Amato. He is remembered for retaining an agreeable simplicity, and for distinguishing himself by correctness of form. Some of his works are in the church of Monte Oliveto, and in the choir of Santa Maria La Nova.

References

Bibliography

1506 births
1567 deaths
16th-century Italian painters
Italian male painters
Painters from Naples
Mannerist painters
16th-century Neapolitan people